Fidelis Gadzama (born 20 October 1979) is a Nigerian athlete and Olympic medalist.

Gadzama was a part of the Nigerian team that received a silver medal in the 4 x 400 metres relay at the 2000 Olympics in Sydney.

The Nigerian team finished second behind the US team, which has later been formally disqualified from the 4x400 meters relay event at the 2000 Olympics by the International Olympic Committee, due to one of the team members' use of illegal performance-enhancing drugs while competing in Sydney.

On 21 July 2012, the 2000 Olympics 4 × 400 m relay medals were reallocated after the USA team was stripped of the gold medal, meaning Gadzama and Nigeria are the gold medalists.

In May 2014, he was elected as a Labour Party Merton London Borough Councillor for Cannon Hill.

References

External links
 

1979 births
Living people
Nigerian male sprinters
Athletes (track and field) at the 2000 Summer Olympics
Olympic athletes of Nigeria
Olympic gold medalists for Nigeria
Athletes (track and field) at the 2002 Commonwealth Games
Commonwealth Games competitors for Nigeria
Medalists at the 2000 Summer Olympics
Olympic gold medalists in athletics (track and field)
Councillors in the London Borough of Merton
Labour Party (UK) councillors
Nigerian expatriates in the United Kingdom
Black British politicians